Alfred Einstein (December 30, 1880February 13, 1952) was a German-American musicologist and music editor. He was born in Munich and fled Nazi Germany after Hitler's Machtergreifung, arriving in the United States by 1939. He is best known for being the editor of the first major revision of the Köchel catalogue, which was published in the year 1936. The Köchel catalogue is the extensive catalogue of the works of Wolfgang Amadeus Mozart.

Biography
Einstein was born in Munich.  Though he originally studied law, he quickly realized his principal love was music, and he acquired a doctorate at Munich University, focusing on instrumental music of the late Renaissance and early Baroque eras, in particular music for the viola da gamba.  In 1918 he became the first editor of the Zeitschrift für Musikwissenschaft; slightly later he became music critic for the Münchner Post; and in 1927 became music critic for the Berliner Tageblatt. In this period he was also a friend of the composer Heinrich Kaspar Schmid in Munich and Augsburg.  In 1933, after Hitler's rise to power, he left Nazi Germany, moving first to London, then to Italy, and finally to the United States in 1939, where he held a succession of teaching posts at universities including Smith College, Columbia University, Princeton University, the University of Michigan, and the Hartt School of Music in Hartford, Connecticut.

Einstein not only researched and wrote detailed works on specific topics, but wrote popular histories of music, including the Short History of Music (1917), and Greatness in Music (1941).  In particular, due to his depth of familiarity with Mozart, he published an important and extensive revision of the Köchel catalogue of Mozart's music (1936). It is this work for which Einstein is most well known. Einstein also published a comprehensive, three-volume set The Italian Madrigal (1949) on the secular Italian form, the first detailed study of the subject. His 1945 volume Mozart: His Character, His Work was an influential study of Mozart and is perhaps his best known book.

Relationship to Albert Einstein
While one source (1980) lists Alfred as a cousin of the scientist Albert Einstein, another claims (1993) that no relationship has been verified.  Some websites claim they were both descended from a Moyses Einstein seven generations back, hence they were sixth cousins. In 1991, Alfred's daughter Eva stated that they were not related.  On the other hand, she wrote in 2003 that they were fifth cousins on one side, and fifth cousins once removed on the other, according to research by George Arnstein.  They were photographed together in 1947 when Albert Einstein received an honorary doctorate from Princeton, but they did not know that they were distantly related.

Works
 Gluck (Master Musicians Series-Series Editor Eric Blom), translated by Eric Blom, J. M. Dent & Sons LTD, 1936
 A Short History of Music, translation of Geschichte der Musik, 1937, rev. 1938, 1947
 Canzoni Sonetti Strambotti et Frottole. Libro Tertio ( Andrea Antico, 1517). Smith College: Northampton, MA, 1941
 Golden Age of the Madrigal: Twelve Five-Part Mixed Choruses. G. Schirmer: New York, 1942
 Greatness in Music, translation of Grösse in der Musik by César Saerchinger, Oxford University Press, 1941
 Mozart: His Character, His Work, translated by Arthur Mendel and Nathan Broder, Oxford University Press, 1945
 Music in the Romantic Era: A History of Musical Thought in the 19th Century, 1947, rev. 1949
 The Italian Madrigal, translated by Alexander H. Krappe, Roger H. Sessions, and Oliver Strunk, Princeton University Press, 1949 (3 volumes)
 Schubert, translated by David Ascoli, Cassell & Co., 1951

References

External links
 

1880 births
1952 deaths
American musicologists
American music critics
Jewish musicologists
Smith College faculty
Columbia University faculty
Princeton University faculty
University of Michigan faculty
Jewish emigrants from Nazi Germany to the United States
German music critics
Jewish American writers
Writers from Munich
Ludwig Maximilian University of Munich alumni
Mozart scholars
Schubert scholars
University of Hartford Hartt School faculty
German biographers
20th-century American biographers
American male biographers
20th-century German musicologists